1994 Verdy Kawasaki season

Review and events
Verdy Kawasaki won J.League NICOS series (second stage).

League results summary

League results by round

Competitions

Domestic results

J.League

Suntory series

NICOS series

J.League Championship

Emperor's Cup

J.League Cup

Super Cup

Sanwa Bank Cup

International results

1993–94 Asian Club Championship

1994–95 Asian Club Championship

Player statistics

 † player(s) joined the team after the opening of this season.

Transfers

In:

Out:

Transfers during the season

In
Capitão (from Associação Portuguesa on April)
Bentinho (on July)
Hisashi Katō (from Shimizu S-Pulse)
Tetsuya Totsuka (loan return from Kashiwa Reysol on November)
Tomo Sugawara (from Yomiuri S.C. youth)
Mitsunori Yabuta (from Yomiuri S.C. youth)
Kei Hoshikawa (from Yomiuri S.C. youth)

Out
Naohito Tomaru
Tsuyoshi Yamamoto
Kazuo Ozaki (retired)
Masahiro Sukigara (to Urawa Red Diamonds on March)
Tetsuya Totsuka (loan to Kashiwa Reysol on June)
Kazuyoshi Miura (loan to Genoa on July)
Paulo (on July)
Bentinho (on December)
||Takayuki Yamaguchi (to Coritiba)

Awards
J.League Most Valuable Player: Pereira
J.League Best XI: Shinkichi Kikuchi, Pereira, Tsuyoshi Kitazawa, Tetsuji Hashiratani, Bismarck, Ruy Ramos, Nobuhiro Takeda
J.League Cup Most Valuable Player: Bismarck

References

Other pages
 J. League official site
 Tokyo Verdy official site

Verdy Kawasaki
Tokyo Verdy seasons